The 1968–69 Houston Mavericks season was the second and final season of the Mavericks in the American Basketball Association. By this point, attendance were at all-time lows at home for the Mavericks, who trudged to finish dead last in a much improved Division, 18 games behind the 4th place Dallas Chaparrals. T.C. Morrow announced to the league that he would not put any more money into the team midway through the year, and the league stepped in to make sure the team did not fold midway through, making trades and such. In January 1969, Jim Gardner agreed to buy the team for $650,000 to move them to North Carolina, which would occur after the season. One bright spot was their performance on January 17, 1969, when the team made 36 of 36 free throws in a 130–118 victory over the New York Nets. April 2, 1969 was the final game in Houston, with a reported attendance of 89, though the Mavericks beat the New York Nets 149–132. The next night, in their final ever game (versus the Dallas Chaparrals), they lost 136–144. The team lived on in Carolina, playing as a regional team. Houston would not have a pro basketball team until 1971, with the Houston Rockets.

Roster
 34 Art Becker - Small forward
 25 Spider Bennett - Point guard
 33 Larry Bunce - Center
 14 Don Carlos - Shooting guard
 33 Dick Clark - Shooting guard
 25 Rich Dumas - Guard
 15 Bill Gaines - Guard
 24 Tom Hoover - Center
 24 Tony Jackson - Small forward
 20 Stew Johnson - Power forward
 52 Tom Kondla - Center
 21 Steve Kramer - Shooting guard
 35 Leary Lentz - Small forward
 31 Guy Manning - Small forward
 21 Jerry Pettway - Shooting guard
 15 Willie Porter - Power forward
 44 Kendall Rhine - Center
 12 Willie Somerset - Point guard
 32 Keith Swagerty - Power forward
 35 Levern Tart - Shooting guard
 22 Bob Verga - Shooting guard
 12 Hank Whitney - Power forward

Final standings

Western Division

C - ABA Champions

Awards and honors
1969 ABA All-Star Game selections (game played on January 28, 1969)
 Willie Somerset

References

 Mavericks on Basketball Reference

External links
 RememberTheABA.com 1968–689 regular season and playoff results
 Houston Mavericks page

Houston Mavericks
Houston
Houston Mavericks, 1968-69
Houston Mavericks, 1968-69